Hovevei Zion (lit. [Those who are] Lovers of Zion), also known as Hibbat Zion, refers to a variety of organizations which were founded in 1881 in response to the Anti-Jewish pogroms in the Russian Empire and were officially constituted as a group at a conference led by Leon Pinsker in 1884.

The organizations are now considered the forerunners and foundation-builders of modern Zionism. Many of the first groups were established in Eastern European countries in the early 1880s with the aim to promote Jewish immigration to Palestine, and advance Jewish settlement there, particularly agricultural. Most of them stayed away from politics.

History

Since the first centuries of the Common Era most Jews had lived outside Palestine, although there had been a constant presence of Jews there as well. According to the Bible and Judaism, Eretz Israel was promised to the Jews by God. The Jewish diaspora began in 586 BCE during the Babylonian occupation of the Land of Israel.

In 1850, Palestine had about 350,000 inhabitants. Roughly 85% were Muslims, 11% were Christians and 4% Jews.

In 1854, Judah Touro bequeathed money to fund Jewish residential settlement in Palestine. Sir Moses Montefiore was appointed executor of his will, and used the funds for a variety of projects, including building the first Jewish residential settlement and almshouse outside of the old walled city of Jerusalem in 1860, which is known today as Mishkenot Sha'ananim quarter. Laurence Oliphant failed in a like attempt to bring to Palestine the Jewish proletariat of Poland, Lithuania, Romania, and the Turkish Empire (1879 and 1882).

In the Russian Empire, waves of pogroms of 1881-1884 (some allegedly state-sponsored), as well as the anti-Semitic May Laws of 1882 introduced by Tsar Alexander III of Russia, deeply affected Jewish communities. More than 2 million Jews fled Russia between 1880 and 1920. The vast majority of them emigrated to the United States, but some decided to form an aliyah to Ottoman-ruled Palestine.

In 1882, a group of ten Hovevei Zion enthusiasts from Kharkiv, Ukraine (then the Russian Empire), headed by Zalman David Levontin and including noted philanthropists Isaac Leib Goldberg and Reuven Yudalevich, founded Rishon LeZion, the first Zionist settlement founded in the Land of Israel by the New Yishuv. This was done despite obstacles posed by the Turkish government, which hindered the purchase of land.  Later, Bilu pioneers strengthened the settlement and enlarged it. For many years, textbooks gave Bilu the credit for the establishment of Rishon LeZion, but in the last decades — after a campaign by the veterans of Rishon and their descendants — Hovevei Zion were given the credit as the founders of the city.

The  Hovevei Zion tract Aruchas bas-ami was authored by Isaac Rülf in 1883, and in 1884, 34 delegates met in Kattowitz, Germany (today Katowice, Poland). Rabbi Samuel Mohilever was elected the president and Leon Pinsker the chairman of the organization they named Hovevei Zion. The group tried to secure financial help from Baron Edmond James de Rothschild and other philanthropists to aid Jewish settlements in Palestine and to organize educational courses. In June 1887, another conference was held in Druskininkai.

The Warsaw chapter was founded by L. L. Zamenhof, who was working on the first grammar textbook of Yiddish ever written, published under the pseudonym "Dr. X" only in 1909, in Lebn un visnshaft, in the article "Vegn a yidisher gramatik un reform in der yidisher shprakh".

In order to attain legal recognition by the authorities, the Russian branch of Hovevei Zion had to meet a demand to be registered as a charity. Early in 1890 its establishment was approved by the Russian government as "The Society for the Support of Jewish Farmers and Artisans in Syria and Eretz Israel," which came to be known as The Odessa Committee. It was dedicated to the practical aspects in establishing agricultural settlements and its projects in 1890–1891 included help in the founding of Rehovot and Hadera and rehabilitation of Mishmar HaYarden.

One of the major donors was the famous tea merchant, Kalonimus Wolf Wissotzky, who founded the largest tea company in Russia, Wissotzky Tea. Wissotzky financed agricultural colonies in Palestine and visited the country in 1884-1885. He later published a book about his visit.

In 1897, before the First Zionist Congress, the Odessa Committee counted over 4,000 members. Once the Congress established the Zionist Organization, most of the Hovevei Zion societies joined it.

See also
 Homeland for the Jewish people
 Mikveh Israel
 Moses Gaster

References

External links
The BILU movement and Hovevei Zion at the WZO
YIVO
The Museum of the Jewish People at Beit Hatfutsot: The Jewish Community of Odessa
Draft of the Statutes of the Odessa Committee at zionistarchives.org.il

 
Zionist organizations